Rebecca "Becky" Quick (born July 18, 1972) is an American television journalist/newscaster and co-anchorwoman of CNBC's financial news shows Squawk Box and On the Money.

Biography

Early life
Quick grew up in Indiana, Ohio, Texas, and Oklahoma as her geologist father and her family followed "booms" in oil production. The family ultimately settled in Medford, New Jersey.

Education and career
Quick graduated from Rutgers University in 1993 with a BA in Political Science, where she was editor-in-chief of The Daily Targum. As an undergraduate, she was awarded the Times Mirror Fellowship from the Journalism Resources Institute at Rutgers. Prior to her employment at CNBC, she covered retail and e-commerce industry topics for The Wall Street Journal and helped launch the paper's website in April 1996. She served as the site's International News Editor, overseeing foreign affairs coverage. She was a co-moderator of the October 28, 2015, Republican presidential debate.

Over the course of her career, Quick has interviewed some of the world's most influential investors and financial power brokers, including among others: Warren Buffett, Bill Gates, Alan Greenspan, T. Boone Pickens, Jamie Dimon, and Charlie Munger. She has also interviewed three U.S. presidents, and hosted the 2007 television documentary "Warren Buffett: The Billionaire Next Door Going Global".

Personal life
Quick was previously married to Peter Shay, a computer programmer. She is currently married to an executive producer of Squawk Box, Matt Quayle (2008–present). On August 16, 2011, CNBC reported that Quick had given birth to a son, Kyle Nathaniel Quayle. In October 2016, Quick gave birth to daughter Kaylie Noelle.

Quick lives in New Jersey with her husband, their children, and his two daughters Natalie and Kimiko.

See also
 List of journalists in New York City

References

External links

 Becky Quick Page at CNBC.com
 

American bloggers
American television journalists
People from Haworth, New Jersey
People from Medford, New Jersey
Rutgers University alumni
The Wall Street Journal people
Journalists from Indiana
1972 births
Living people
American women television journalists
CNBC people
American women bloggers
Journalists from New Jersey
20th-century American non-fiction writers
20th-century American women writers
People from Minneapolis
Journalists from Minnesota
21st-century American non-fiction writers
21st-century American women writers